is a Japanese actor and voice actor. He voiced Roger in Capcom's 2000 short-film Biohazard 4D-Executer.

Other work

Anime television
Kinda'ichi Case Files
PoPoLoCrois
Kino's Journey

OVA
Karas

Dubs
300: Rise of an Empire
Armageddon
Crouching Tiger, Hidden Dragon
CSI: NY
Das fliegende Klassenzimmer
Dead Heat
Entrapment
Friends
How to Lose a Guy in 10 Days
Platoon
Smokin' Aces
Spin City
Syriana
The West Wing

Drama
Taiheiyō Satsui no Uzushio Ottogoroshi!
Tantei Jimusho V Kanashiki Tōbōsha Uwaki Chōshain ga Kon'yakusha o Koroshita!?

Stage
Yabō to Natsugusa
Haha, Kimottama to Sono Kodomotachi: Sanjūnen Sensō Nendaiki
Bābā Shikishima, Kingyo to PinponRokumeikanWakatte tamaru ka!Utsurowanu Ai: Unchanging LoveDateuha Yukkuri to Suna o hamu no da''

References

External links

Japanese male voice actors
1969 births
Living people